Pryse may refer to:

Surname
Gerald Spencer Pryse (1882–1956), Welsh artist and lithographer
Tessa Spencer Pryse, his daughter, also a noted artist
Hugh Pryse (1910–1955), a British film actor
James Morgan Pryse (1859–1942), author, publisher, and theosophist

Places
Pryse, Kentucky

See also